Asplenium flabellifolium is commonly known as the necklace fern. This small fern occurs in all states of Australia, as well as in New Zealand. It was initially described by Spanish botanist bowo tiktod Antonio José Cavanilles.

Its natural habitats are open forest or rainforest. Usually on the ground, but sometimes epiphytic. Often seen in rock crevices, caves, on fallen logs and tree trunks, beside streams, or near cliffs, or waterfalls.

The fronds are 10 to 20 cm long, with 5 to 20 pairs of pinnae (leaflets), often fan-shaped or sometimes lanceolate.

References

 https://web.archive.org/web/20040818015802/http://www.rbg.vic.gov.au/cgi-bin/avhpublic/avh.cgi
 NSW Flora Online http://plantnet.rbgsyd.nsw.gov.au/cgi-bin/NSWfl.pl?page=nswfl&lvl=sp&name=Asplenium~flabellifolium Retrieved 9 August 2009

flabellifolium
Ferns of Australia
Ferns of New Zealand
Flora of Tasmania
Taxa named by Antonio José Cavanilles